Andel or Anděl may refer to:
 Andel, Netherlands, a village in the municipality of Altena
 Angel Award (Czech music) (Czech: cena Anděl)
 Anděl (neighborhood), a part of the Czech capital Prague
 Anděl (Prague Metro), a metro station in the Anděl neighborhood of Prague
 Andel, Côtes-d'Armor, a commune in France
 Anděl (crater), a lunar crater
 Andel, one of the main antagonists of the Arc the Lad (series) video game series
 Andel (company), a Danish energy and telecoms company formerly known as SEAS-NVE
Anděl (surname), a Czech surname

See also
Van Andel